The name Amang has been used in the Philippines by PAGASA in the Western Pacific. Amang means a Filipino nickname of a man.
 Typhoon Kujira (2003) (T0302, 02W, Amang)
 Typhoon Yutu (2007) (T0702, 02W, Amang) – an early super typhoon of the season.
 Tropical Depression Amang (2011) (02W, Amang)
 Tropical Storm Mekkhala (2015) (T1501, 01W, Amang) – an early-forming tropical cyclone of the season.
 Tropical Depression Amang (2019) (01W, Amang)

 

Pacific typhoon set index articles